Pamela Britton (born Armilda Jane Owens, March 19, 1923 – June 17, 1974) was an American actress, best known for appearing as Lorelei Brown in the television series My Favorite Martian (1963–1966) and for her female lead in the film noir classic D.O.A. (1950). Throughout her acting career, Britton appeared often on Broadway and in several Hollywood and television films.

Early career
Armilda Jane Owens was born in Milwaukee, Wisconsin, to Ethel (Waite) and Dr. Raymond Gilbert Owens, a physician. Her mother was a prominent stage, radio, and early television actress. She had two sisters: Virginia, who was an actress for RKO Radio Pictures; and Mary, a social worker. Armilda attended Holy Angels Academy and the State Teacher's Normal School in her home town of Milwaukee. By the age of nine she was doing summer stock, and Hollywood came calling at age ten. Her mother rejected the advances, saying she wanted her to be an actress, not a child star. Owen started auditioning for roles at the age of 15, using the name "Gloria Jane Owen". She found that as soon as people knew who her mother was, they expected her to be as accomplished an actress. She used a pseudonym to audition under, choosing Pamela (from a British book) and Britton (to emphasize the source). In 1943 she found voice work as Jackie Gleason's mother-in-law on "The Honeymooners" radio show.

Theatre work
After a stint touring with bandleader Don McGuire, Britton's big break came when she was cast as both Celeste Holm's understudy and as Gertie in the Broadway production of Oklahoma! She played Meg Brockie in the Broadway production of Brigadoon (1947). When Oklahoma! went on tour, she took over Holm's role as Ado Annie.

Britton's New York agent eventually sent her credentials to Metro-Goldwyn-Mayer executive Marvin Schneck. He came to see one of her performances in Chicago, and was disappointed.  He returned a second night, however, after additional cajoling from her agent, and he signed Britton immediately.

Hollywood
Britton's first role in a major production was as Frank Sinatra's girlfriend in Anchors Aweigh. Afterward, however, came a forgettable part in A Letter for Evie in 1946.  She went on hiatus to play the comic role of Meg Brockie in the original 1947 production of Brigadoon on Broadway. She returned to the big screen opposite Clark Gable in Key to the City (1950), and then went on to make her most significant film appearance in the classic D.O.A., also in 1950. She made her third film of the year in the Red Skelton vehicle, Watch the Birdie (1951).  About 19 years passed before she returned to the big screen.

Britton portrayed the title role of the TV version of the Chic Young newspaper comic strip Blondie (1957), opposite Arthur Lake as her husband, Dagwood Bumstead. She reprised her role in Brigadoon in 1954, appeared in Annie Get Your Gun at the Santa Barbara Bowl, and then returned to Broadway to replace an ailing Janis Paige in Guys and Dolls.

My Favorite Martian
What is perhaps her signature role began in 1963 and lasted until 1966 when she appeared as the nosy and ditzy landlady, Mrs. Lorelei Brown, in My Favorite Martian. After the series ended, Britton appeared in the movies, If It's Tuesday, This Must Be Belgium and Suppose They Gave a War and Nobody Came.

Personal life and death
Britton was married on April 8, 1943, in Texas, to Captain Arthur Steel after they met on a blind date arranged by one of her sisters. After the wedding, he was posted to Italy on active service while Britton remained working at home. They had a daughter, Katherine Lee (born September 8, 1946). After the war, Steel worked as an advertising executive and went on to manage the Gene Autry hotels (Steel and Autry were first cousins). As their daughter grew up, Britton worked mainly in West Coast theater. After performing on tour with Don Knotts in The Mind with the Dirty Man, Britton was admitted to Northwest Community Hospital in Arlington Heights, Illinois, where she died of brain cancer on June 17, 1974, aged 51.

Filmography

References

External links

1923 births
1974 deaths
American film actresses
American musical theatre actresses
American television actresses
People from Arlington Heights, Illinois
Deaths from brain cancer in the United States
Actresses from Milwaukee
University of Wisconsin–Milwaukee alumni
20th-century American actresses
20th-century American women singers
20th-century American singers